Nicolaus Pol (c. 1467 – 1532) was a Renaissance-era physician. He entered the service of Sigismund of Austria at Innsbruck in 1487, and continued to serve Sigismund's successors, emperors Maximilian and Charles until his death in 1532, at an age of about 65 years. He received a medical degree in 1494, and marked the inside cover of all the books in his library with Nicolaus Pol, doctor, 1494.

Pol collected a substantial library, estimated at some 1350 volumes, an enormous number at the time. The subject matters included all topics of interest to the "Renaissance man", including medicine, natural sciences, alchemy, astrology and divination, etc.

After Pol's death in 1532, his library passed to Innichen Abbey in South Tyrol. 

Work

References
 Max H. Fisch and Dorothy M. Schullian, Nicolaus Pol Doctor 1494, Cleveland Medical Library Association,  1947.
Catalogue of Medical Works from the Library of Dr. Nicolaus Pol: Born c. 1470, Court Physician to the Emperor Maximilian I, Maggs, 1929.

External links
The Nicolaus Pol Collection

1460s births
1532 deaths
16th-century German physicians
16th-century Austrian physicians
Bibliophiles
German people of the Renaissance period
16th-century German writers
16th-century German male writers